Shaw Islands is a group of four islands lying  north of the central part of McKinnon Island, off the coast of Enderby Land. Plotted from ANARE (Australian National Antarctic Research Expeditions) air photos taken in 1956. Named by Antarctic Names Committee of Australia (ANCA) for John E. Shaw (1929-2017), an Australian physicist at Mawson Station in 1957.

See also 
 List of Antarctic and sub-Antarctic islands

Islands of Enderby Land